The United States Bobsled & Skeleton Federation (USBSF) is the official national governing body (NGB) for bobsled and skeleton in the United States. It serves as the American representative for the International Bobsleigh and Tobogganing Federation and is chartered by the United States Olympic Committee.

The USBSF is headquartered in Lake Placid, NY with administrative offices located in Colorado Springs, CO.

Bobsled Olympic Medal table

Skeleton Olympic Medal table

External links

Organizations based in New York (state)
Sports governing bodies in the United States
United States at the Winter Olympics
Skeleton in the United States
Bobsleigh in the United States